Sofia Alves (born 25 September 1973 in Luanda, Angola) is a Portuguese film, television and stage actress. She began her acting career as a stage actress and has since appeared in several Portuguese films and television programmes, mostly telenovelas. She currently stars as Hortense Monforte in the telenovella Remédio Santo.

Biography 
Born on September 25, 1973, in Luanda.

Still young, in 1993, he appeared in cinema at the hands of director Manoel de Oliveira — he had a participation in the film Vale Abraão, adapted from the homonymous work by Agustina Bessa Luís. Played Lolota, daughter of Ema, the Portuguese bovarinha and protagonist of the film, and Carlos, characters played by Leonor Silveira and Luís Miguel Cintra, respectively. She would work again with Mestre Oliveira in A Caixa, adapted from the play by Prista Monteiro and filmed in 1994, where she plays the prostitute. For the rest, he would return to cinema by the hand of João Mário Grilo, in the film 605 Forte, and with Joaquim Gouveia, in Um Piscar de Olhos.

In theater, he had sporadic participations, integrating the cast of the plays O Dia Seguinte, by Luiz Francisco Rebello at Teatro da Trindade; Rita's Education, by Willy Russel, staged by Celso Cleto at Casino Estoril, Socorro! I am pregnant, with the same director, interpreting texts by Inês Pedrosa on abortion, and Boa Noite, Mãe, alongside Manuela Maria who toured the country for 2 years with a large national tour, followed by Madrid, where it was a great success (Sources: ABC Spain; Expresso; Ludicum; La Guia Go). Hedda Gabler, by Ibsen, sold out the Teatro de Belas Artes in Madrid, (Sources: Guia del Ócio; Instituto Português da Cultura; Expresso; DN Artes). Sabina Freire followed, for the celebrations of the 100th anniversary of the Republic, with the high patronage of the President of the Republic Aníbal Cavaco Silva, a show that was once again on stage at the Teatro de Belas Artes in Madrid, with applause from the critics and the [(Source: Correio da Manhã). After a three-year hiatus, he returns to the stage with A Casa do Fim da Linha by playwright Celso Cleto.

She is one of the most requested and most popular actresses on Portuguese television. After, at the end of 1992, having started his television career in A Banqueira do Povo and participating in series (Ballet Rose (1998) or Jornalistas (1999), he stood out as the protagonist of several telenovelas.

Some of the characters, in soap operas, that highlighted the actress were two protagonists that the actress brought to life, that is, Luísa Negrão and Leonor in Olhos de Água (TVI, 2000/2001), in which she played the two twin sisters. Also noteworthy are Joana Figueiredo, the character the actress portrayed in A Jóia de África (TVI, 2002); And the characters Margarida Monteiro in O Teu Olhar (TVI, 2003/2004), Sara Botelho in Fala-me de Amor (TVI, 2005/2006), Clara Machado da Câmara in Ilha dos Amores (TVI, 2007).

One of the milestones of her career was the character Hortense, in Remédio Santo (2011/12, TVI), it was such a remarkable role that the public awarded the actress the TV7 Dias Trophy for Best Leading Actress in 2011.

Her last television project was in the telenovela "Mulheres", where she gave life to the character Mariana, a character that, in the words of the actress, was the most important of her career in television due to the density of the role and the strong dramatic load. Her demanding and versatile work has earned her the highest praise from critics and the public for her extraordinary performance and several nominations for best actress awards.

She has been married since 2007 to director Celso Cleto. He lives between Lapa do Lobo, in the municipality of Nelas, and Oeiras, where he carries out his professional activity.

He is currently on a major international tour in Spain with the play “Freno de mano” which premiered in August 2018 in Bilbao at the prestigious Euskalduna theater, alongside the show “Porta com Porta” which premiered in 2017 in Portugal (it’s been 4 years since scene). Dedicated exclusively to theater in recent years, she was honored on the Walk of Fame in Portugal with her name inscribed on the Portuguese pavement.

Television

Theater

Cinema

Awards and nominations 
-Awards:
 Lux Magazine Award, Best Theater Actress 2006 (Ana, Help I'm Pregnant, staged by Celso Cleto);
 Trophies TV7 Dias 2011, Best Actress in a Series (Helena Bastos, 37, TVI);
 Lux Magazine Award "Feminine Personality 2011", Television/Fiction Category (Hortense Monforte, Remédio Santo, TVI)
 Trophies TV7 Dias 2012, Best Actress in a Soap Opera (Hortense Monforte, Remédio Santo, TVI)
 Trophies TV7 Dias 2013, Best Actress in a Soap Opera (Hortense Monforte, Remédio Santo, TVI)
 Female Personality Award in the Television Category (Fiction) Revista Lux , 2012
 Personality of the Year/Culture Distinction Award - Baile da Rosa, 2013
 Trophies TV7 Dias 2015, Best Actress in a Soap Opera (Mariana Fonseca-Mulheres TVI)
 tribute with his name on the Walk of Fame in Portugal, 2019

-Nominations:
 Golden Globes 2001, Best Actress of the Year in Television (Luísa/Leonor, Olhos de Água, TVI);
 Golden Globes 2002, Best Actress of the Year on Television (Luísa/Leonor, Olhos de Água, TVI);
 Golden Globes 2003, Best Actress of the Year on Television (Joana, Jóia de África, TVI);
 TV7 Dias Awards 2009, Best Actress in a Soap Opera (Ana Maria Torres, Flor do Mar, TVI)
 TV Awards Trophies TV7Dias 2013, Best Actress in a Leading Cast (Isadora Belmonte-destinations crossed TVI)

External links 
 

1973 births
Living people
Portuguese film actresses
Portuguese television actresses
Portuguese stage actresses